Daniel Ricardo da Silva Soares (born 30 January 1982), commonly known as Dani, is a Portuguese professional footballer who plays for F.C. Maia as a midfielder.

Club career

Portugal
Dani started playing football for F.C. Vizela, located near his birthcity of Felgueiras. He remained 14 years with the club his youth spell accounted for, playing his first four seasons as a senior in the third division, the latter ending in league conquest and promotion to the second level.

For the 2006–07 campaign, Dani moved to the Primeira Liga with F.C. Paços de Ferreira, making his debut in the competition on 27 August 2006 in a 1–2 away loss against S.C. Braga (90 minutes played). He started in all his league appearances during his short tenure.

Cluj
During the 2007 winter transfer window, Dani signed a four-and-a-half-year contract with CFR Cluj in Romania. He scored his first Liga I goal more than one year later, in a 1–1 draw at FC Unirea Urziceni.

Dani finished his first full season with 29 games as the team won the national championship, going on to be an important midfield unit in the conquest of seven major titles, including three consecutive Romanian Cups.

Greece
On 31 August 2010, Dani agreed to a two-year deal at Iraklis Thessaloniki F.C. of the Superleague Greece. He made his competitive debut for his new club on 11 September, in a 1–1 away draw to Atromitos FC. He scored his first league goal in the 19th round of the season, opening the score against AEK Athens F.C. in an eventual 2–0 win for the hosts.

In late July 2011, Dani joined fellow league side Skoda Xanthi FC.

Honours
Vizela
Portuguese Second Division: 2004–05

CFR Cluj
Liga I: 2007–08, 2009–10
Cupa României: 2007–08, 2008–09, 2009–10
Supercupa României: 2009, 2010

References

External links
 
 
 

1982 births
Living people
People from Felgueiras
Portuguese footballers
Association football midfielders
Primeira Liga players
Liga Portugal 2 players
Segunda Divisão players
F.C. Vizela players
F.C. Paços de Ferreira players
Vitória F.C. players
F.C. Lixa players
Liga I players
CFR Cluj players
Super League Greece players
Iraklis Thessaloniki F.C. players
Xanthi F.C. players
F.C. Maia players
Portuguese expatriate footballers
Expatriate footballers in Romania
Expatriate footballers in Greece
Portuguese expatriate sportspeople in Romania
Portuguese expatriate sportspeople in Greece
Sportspeople from Porto District